Aikawa Dam  is a rockfill dam located in Miyagi Prefecture in Japan. The dam is used for irrigation. The catchment area of the dam is 5.6 km2. The dam impounds about 17  ha of land when full and can store 1770 thousand cubic meters of water. The construction of the dam was started on 1983 and completed in 1996. The dam is constructed in Aikawa river.

See also
List of dams in Japan

References

Dams in Miyagi Prefecture